The Montgomery Grey Sox were a Negro Southern League (NSL) baseball team based in Montgomery, Alabama. While the NSL was regarded as a minor league throughout most of its existence, with the collapse of the first Negro National League in 1931, the league is considered a major league for that one season.

When the team started with the Negro Southern League in 1920, they were headed by John Staples, named the president of the club. Staples even stepped in to umpire a game during the 1920 season. The team was managed that year by Henry Hannon, who also played first base and other positions during the first season.

In 1920 the Grey Sox made it into the league pennant race with a 3-0 perfect game win over Atlanta.

In 1920, the Grey Sox played in Southside Park.

Several players who had previously played the club stayed with the team when the NSL became a major league in 1932, including Paul Hardy, Matthew Jackson, Felix Manning and Everett Nelson.

Notes

References
 The Complete Book of Baseball's Negro Leagues by John Holway
 The Biographical Encyclopedia of the Negro Baseball Leagues by James Riley

External links
 Franchise history at Seamheads.com

Negro league baseball teams
Defunct baseball teams in Alabama
Baseball teams disestablished in 1932
Baseball teams established in 1932